Fransérgio Euripedes Ferreira Bastos better known by his mononym Fransérgio (born June 4, 1980 in Franca, Brazil), is a Brazilian football player last playing for Kocaelispor in midfield position. He has Turkish dual citizenship under the name Ferhat Sergio.

Career 
Bastos also played for Clube Atlético Juventus in Brazil and Sivasspor in Turkey.

References

External links
 Profile at CBF.com.br 
 Profile at TFF.org
 Guardian's Stats Centre 

1980 births
Living people
Brazilian footballers
Brazilian expatriate footballers
Brazilian expatriate sportspeople in Turkey
Expatriate footballers in Turkey
Brazilian emigrants to Turkey
Turkish people of Brazilian descent
Kocaelispor footballers
Sivasspor footballers
Kasımpaşa S.K. footballers
Clube Atlético Juventus players
Figueirense FC players
Naturalized citizens of Turkey
Süper Lig players
People from Franca
Association football midfielders
Footballers from São Paulo (state)
Converts to Islam